Under the Whyte notation for the classification of steam locomotives,  represents the wheel arrangement of an articulated locomotive with two separate swivelling engine units, arranged  back to back with the boiler and cab suspended between them. Each engine unit has two leading wheels in a leading truck, six powered and coupled driving wheels on three axles and no trailing wheels.

The arrangement is effectively two  locomotives operating back-to-back and was used on Garratt and Kitson-Meyer articulated locomotives. Since the 2-6-0 type was often known as a Mogul, the corresponding Garratt type was sometimes known as a Double Mogul.

Overview
The 2-6-0+0-6-2 was the second Garratt type to appear after the original  and was first used on the fourth through ninth Garratts to be constructed.

Usage

Australia

A group of six locomotives of  gauge were constructed for the Western Australian Government Railways in 1911 as their Class M. Further locomotives for this railway included seven more Class Ms locomotives in 1912.

The Australian Portland Cement Company took delivery of two  gauge locomotives in 1936 and 1939, as their no. 1 and no. 2 engines for the Fyansford Cement Works Railway. These engines replaced two Vulcan Iron Works  on the mainline haul until they were later displaced by Australian Standard Garratt no. G33.

Fyansford’s no. 2, by then a combination of no. 2's centre unit and no. 1's engine units, was in service until 1966, when the quarry line was replaced by a conveyor belt. Fyansford no. 2 was to be evaluated in 2015 for return to service on the Bellarine Railway, after having been moved there from the Menzies Creek Museum of the Puffing Billy Railway in 2010.

Philippines

The Manila Railway Company (now the Philippine National Railways) operated four 160-class Kitson-Meyer locomotives that were built in 1914. It was once disputed as to whether the class was 2-6-0+0-6-2T or 2-6-6-2T. Two sources mentioned that they were 2-6-0+0-6-2T, while one source claims that they were actually . It was later confirmed in the Kitson Steam Locomotive Catalogue (1839-1923) that the locomotives were classified by Kitson as a 2-6-0+0-6-2T.

As most of the Meyer locomotives were found in South America, the Manila Railway was the only known operator of the type in Asia. It was also the only articulated locomotive class operated by the company. These tank locomotives were made to operate on the Antipolo line. However due to the steep gradient and a high operational cost, the line was closed in 1917. These locomotives were then relegated to the Pagsanjan line in Laguna and the South Main Line between Manila and Lucena. These locomotives were retired in 1925 after being replaced by larger tender locomotives.

South Africa

Narrow gauge

Between 1919 and 1925, the South African Railways (SAR) placed five Class  Garratt locomotives with this wheel arrangement in service on the Avontuur  narrow gauge line through the Langkloof and also in Natal. They were the first Garratt locomotives to enter service in South Africa. The three locomotives, numbered 51 to 53, were erected at Uitenhage and put on trials on the Avontuur line in May 1920. These first three locomotives were not superheated. They had outside plate frames, Walschaerts valve gear, Belpaire fireboxes and used saturated steam and slide valves.

Having been proven successful during trials, another two locomotives were ordered from Beyer, Peacock & Company. Numbers 54 and 55 were delivered in 1925 and placed in service in Natal. Since these two were superheated, they had longer smokeboxes and were  longer in overall length, while the incorporation of piston valves required alteration of the valve gear. The cabs of the second order locomotives were also improved to offer better protection to the crew.

Cape gauge

In February 1921, the SAR placed a single experimental Class GA Garratt  locomotive in service. It was ordered from Beyer, Peacock & Company in 1914, together with the order for the narrow gauge Class NG G11 Garratts, but wartime hostilities also delayed its delivery until 1920. It was the first Cape gauge Garratt to enter service in South Africa.

The locomotive was superheated, with a Belpaire firebox, a plate frame and Walschaerts valve gear. It was erected in the Durban shops and placed in trial service on the Natal mainline. During the trials it was found that the absence of trailing carrying wheels on the engine units was a disadvantage, since it led to excessive flange wear on the driving wheels. As a result, the locomotive remained the only representative of its Class and all subsequent Garratt models of the SAR were equipped with trailing Bissel trucks on their engine units. The locomotive was withdrawn from service in 1938 because of a cracked frame and scrapped.

United Kingdom

Narrow Gauge

One 21st century example of this wheel arrangement has been built for the Wells & Walsingham Light Railway, a  gauge heritage railway in Norfolk, England. An earlier 2-6-0+0-6-2 Garratt, no. 3, the Norfolk Hero, was built by Neil Simkins in 1986. In 2010, the fleet was augmented by a new Garratt, no. 6, the Norfolk Heroine.

Standard Gauge
The London, Midland, and Scottish Railway built 33 garratt locomotives (3 in 1927, 30 in 1930) to use as heavy freight engines. They were withdrawn from 1955-8.

References

External links

 
 
6,2-6-0+0-6-2